The Bell Inn, Long Hanborough is a well-established Grade II listedrestaurant and public house in the village of Long Hanborough, Oxfordshire, England.

The Bell borders the grounds of Blenheim Palace, Woodstock where Sir Winston Churchill was born.
It was renovated in 2008, providing an open-plan interior with bar and restaurant. Outside, there are views over the Evenlode Valley.

The pub featured in a food riot by women at the turn of the 19th century.

Parts of the building date from the seventeenth century, but it has been extended and modified subsequently.

References

External links 
 The Bell – Long Hanborough, Facebook
 West Oxfordshire Community Web listing

Grade II listed pubs in Oxfordshire
Restaurants in Oxfordshire